The first generation of the coupé and convertible range of the BMW 2 Series subcompact executive car consists of the BMW 2 Series (F22) for the coupé version and BMW 2 Series (F23) for the convertible version. The F22/F23 has been in production since November 2013 and is often collectively referred to as the F22.

The F22 was released as the successor to the E82 1 Series coupé and E88 1 Series convertible. It is currently produced in Leipzig, previously alongside the F20 1 Series hatchback range.

The high-performance F87 M2 model is produced in the coupe body style. It is powered by the BMW N55 and BMW S55 turbocharged inline-six engines.

The United States is the most popular market for the 2 Series, accounting for one-third of all sales, followed by Germany and Great Britain.

Development and launch 
The coupé model premiered at the 2014 North American International Auto Show, with sales beginning in March 2014. The convertible model premiered later in October at the 2014 Paris Motor Show, and launched in February 2015. The exterior design was led by Christopher Weil.

The F22 2 Series has a 50:50 weight distribution and features a MacPherson strut front suspension and a five-link rear suspension. Compared to the E82 1 Series coupé, the F22 2 Series is  longer,  wider, and  lower. The 2 Series has a reduced drag coefficient of 0.29  for the 220i Coupé.

All models meet the Euro 6 exhaust emissions standard.

Body styles

Equipment 

Standard equipment includes automatic climate control, iDrive with a 6.5-inch display, and 60:40 split folding rear seats. The 2 Series is available in Sport Line, Modern Line, and M Sport trim. Sport line models feature gloss black exterior trim, while Modern line models feature aluminium exterior trim. M Sport models feature a  lower suspension, sport seats, and M exterior styling.

218-230 with the M Sport trim and M235-240 models can be fitted with M Performance Parts. These include a splitter, side skirts, lip spoiler and diffuser.

Optional equipment includes automatic parking, traffic sign recognition, a Harman Kardon HiFi system, and Apple CarPlay. Models are also available with iDrive Professional Navigation which features a larger 8.8-inch display with a built-in SIM card with LTE support, allowing for automatic over-the-air updates for live traffic information and on-street parking information.

Models

Petrol engines

Diesel engines

BMW M2

M2 (F87) 

In November 2015, BMW unveiled their high-performance version of the 2 Series, the M2, with sales beginning in 2016 and only being available as a 2-door coupe. The Competition replaced the standard car in 2018 with the CS being revealed in November 2019 and sales beginning in March 2020, with 2,200 units planned.

Special variants

M235i Track Edition 
For 2015 BMW sold the M235i Track Edition as a limited production model in certain markets. In Canada, it was limited to 50 units. It came with the same N55B30 engine as the standard M235i, but was equipped with a limited-slip differential, M Performance suspension, and M Performance exhaust, while power seat motors and the sunroof were eliminated to save weight. Other changes included special wheels, carbon mirror caps, a trunk lip spoiler, and a full M Performance aerodynamics package.

Model year changes

2016 
The following changes were available from summer 2016:
Engine in 4-cylinder models upgraded to B48B20 2.0 L I4 turbo
Engine in 6-cylinder models upgraded to B58B30O0 3.0 L I6 turbo
iDrive 5.0 system introduced
 Wireless charging option available

2017 facelift 
The following changes apply to facelift models, which were launched in July 2017:

 Exterior designed changes including: updated front fascia with hexagonal LED headlights, updated LED taillights, and new alloy designs and exterior paint options
 Interior design changes including: a redesigned dashboard and additional leather and cloth options

2019 
 All models now feature darkened rear lights from March 2019
 225d model discontinued.

Production volumes 
The following are production figures for the 2 Series:

BMW does not break down sales between 2 series variants such as the F22, F23, F87, F45, and F46. The F45 and F46 make up the majority of 2 series sales globally.

Awards 
 2014 Red Dot Good Design Award
 2014 and 2015 Sport Auto "Best coupé up to €50,000"
 2015 Auto Zeitung Design Award (compact class convertibles)
 2015 and 2019 Car and Driver's 10Best
 2016 Auto Bild Sportscars "Sports Car of the Year"
 2016 Auto motor und sport "Autonis Best New Design" in the compact class
 2016 and 2017 Car of the Year Japan "Emotional Car of the Year"

References

External links 
 Official site

2 Series (F22)
F22
Coupés
Rear-wheel-drive vehicles
Cars introduced in 2013
2020s cars